An American Classic is a studio album by American country artist Jeannie Seely. It was released on August 14, 2020, via Curb Records. The album was produced by Don Cusic and contained thirteen tracks. The record is Seely's seventeenth studio project and first in three years. The album contains a mixture of new recordings as well as re-recordings of her familiar tunes. Various collaborators are featured on the project that provide harmony and duet vocals to different recordings. The album was given a positive critical response upon its release.

Background
An American Classic was produced by Don Cusic. The idea for the project was crafted by Cusic who became interested in recording an album for Seely. Seely agreed after finding that Cusic was interested in recording her, later saying that she was "thrilled" to work with him. "She is a favorite of fans, as well as country singers who admire and respect her talent and love her as a classy lady. The title of this album, An American Classic fits her perfectly," Cusic commented. Jim Ed Norman also contributed a track featuring Ray Stevens to the record's production.

Content
An American Classic consists of 13 tracks. The album includes a mixture of re-recorded songs and new songs. In addition, many of the project's tracks included collaborations with other artists. Among the collaborations is the track, "Not a Dry Eye in the House." The song is a duet with Willie Nelson that was first recorded by its songwriter Dallas Wayne. Seely and Nelson first began a friendship in 1963 around the time she began her music career. In addition to vocals from Nelson, Seely also collaborated with several other country artists for the album. This includes Bill Anderson, Lorrie Morgan, Waylon Payne, Ray Stevens, Steve Wariner and The Whites. Seely and Anderson recorded the track "When Two Worlds Collide" for the album, which he had first composed with Roger Miller. With Ray Stevens, Seely recorded a duet of Paul McCartney's "Dance Tonight."

Seely also recorded other collaborations, including the song "All Through Crying Over You." The track features harmony vocals from Seely's longtime friend Rhonda Vincent, who had recently cut one of Seely's compositions, "Like I Could", which was later issued as a single. Additional tracks also feature artists on the project. An example is the song "If You Could Call It That." The song was written after a friend found an unfinished song journal from Seely's friend and country artist Dottie West. Songwriters Bobby Tomberlin and Steve Wariner adapted West's journal notes into a song. Two of Seely's former hits were re-recorded for the album project: "Don't Touch Me" and "Can I Sleep in Your Arms." Both songs were written by her first husband and songwriter, Hank Cochran.

Release and reception

The announcement of An American Classic was first made public in fall 2019. The original intention was to release the album in the spring of 2020. However, the album was pushed back to summer 2020 In conjunction with Seely's 80th birthday on July 6, "Not a Dry Eye in the House" was released as a digital download. "To have a duet with Willie Nelson be the first song released from my upcoming album is icing on the cake," Seely later commented. An American Classic was officially released on August 14, 2020, via Curb Records. The album was offered as both a compact disc and a music download.

Following its release, An American Classic received positive review by writers and music critics. Tom Netherland gave the project a positive response in his story of the album's release, calling it a project full of "postcards from the heart." Netherland also added that the album's release signifies Seely's status as an important female country artist. "Seely belongs in the midst of Loretta Lynn and Kitty Wells as a member of the Country Music Hall of Fame. Like an author with pen in hand, whenever she sings, Seely adds another page in the annals of a career made legendary," he concluded. In addition, Markos Papadatos of Digital Journal gave the album a positive critical response in his review. Papadatos praised the album's eclectic mix of collaborations as well as its mix of musical styles. He concluded by giving the collection an "A" rating: "Grand Ole Opry star Jeannie Seely proves that she is like fine wine, where she only better with age and experience on her latest studio offering An American Classic."

Track listing

Personnel
Musical personnel
 Bill Anderson – guest vocals
 Vince Gill – guest vocals
 Lorrie Morgan – guest vocals
 Willie Nelson – guest vocals
 Waylon Payne – guest vocals
 Jeannie Seely – lead vocals 
 Ray Stevens – guest vocals
 Rhonda Vincent – guest vocals
 Steve Wariner – guest vocals
 The Whites – guest vocals

Technical personnel
 Don Cusic – producer
 Jim Ed Norman – executive producer

Release history

References

External links
 Discography at Jeannie Seely's official website

2020 albums
Albums produced by Jim Ed Norman
Curb Records albums
Jeannie Seely albums